Bill Hodge (1882–1958) was Scottish football manager who managed Scottish League club Cowdenbeath. He also served as chairman of the club for 19 years until stepping down in 1955.

Managerial career 
Hodge managed Scottish League Second Division club Cowdenbeath between 1938 and 1939 and managed the club to the division championship in his only full season in management. The outbreak of the Second World War in September 1939 prematurely ended the club's first top-flight season for five years. Hodge recorded 37 wins, 6 draws and 14 defeats in all competitions.

Honours 
Cowdenbeath

 Scottish League Second Division: 1938–39

References 

Cowdenbeath F.C. managers
Scottish Football League managers
Scottish football managers
1882 births
1958 deaths